Françesko Xhaja (born August 9, 1993) is an Italian kickboxer, currently competing in the light heavyweight division of ONE Championship. As of March 2023, he is ranked as the tenth best heavyweight kickboxer in the world by Beyond Kick.

Professional kickboxing career

Early career
Xhaja faced Jan Beljajev at Number One Fight Show: Season 10 on September 22, 2018. He won the fight by unanimous decision. Xhaja next faced Mladen Kujundžić at Ultimate Fight Night on November 17, 2018. He won the fight by unanimous decision.

Xhaja challenged Guto Inocente for the WGP Kickboxing Super heavyweight (+94kg) title at WGP Kickboxing #55 on June 15, 2019. He lost the fight by unanimous decision.

Xhaja faced Igor Darmeshkin in the quarterfinals of the 2019 Tatneft Cup heavyweight tournament, which took place on July 19, 2019. He won the fight by unanimous decision, after an extra round was contested. Xhaja was able to stop Mathieu Kongolo in the second round on October 4, 2019, which earned him a place in the tournament finals, which took place on December 15, 2019, opposite Petr Romankevich. He lost the fight by unanimous decision, after an extension round was fought.

Xhaja faced Strahinja Mitrić at Megdan 8: New Winners on December 18, 2020. He won the fight by split decision. Xhaja next faced Cyril Cereyon at Ultimate Fight Night on January 17, 2021. He won the fight by unanimous decision. Xhaja then faced Ahmed Krnjić at Senshi 9 on July 10, 2021. He won the fight by unanimous decision, after an extra round was contested.

ONE Championship
Xhaja faced Rade Opačić at ONE: Only the Brave on January 28, 2023, in his promotion debut with ONE Championship. He lost the fight by a second-round technical knockout.

Xhaja faced Andrei Stoica at ONE Fight Night 7 on February 24, 2023. He won the fight by split decision.

Championships and accomplishments
Tatneft Cup
2019 Tatneft Cup Heavyweight Tournament Runner-up
Megdan Fighting
2020 Megdan K-1 Heavyweight (+93 kg) Championship

Fight record

|-
|-  style="background:#cfc;"
| 2023-02-24 || Win ||align=left| Andrei Stoica || ONE Fight Night 7 || Bangkok, Thailand || Decision (Split) || 3 || 3:00
|-
|- style="background:#fbb;"
| 2022-01-28 || Loss || align="left" | Rade Opačić || ONE: Only the Brave  || Kallang, Singapore || TKO (3 knockdown rule)|| 2|| 2:00
|- 
|-  style="background:#cfc;"
| 2021-07-10 || Win ||align=left| Ahmed Krnjić || Senshi 9 || Varna, Bulgaria || Ext. R. Decision (Unanimous) || 4 || 3:00 
|-
|-  style="background:#cfc;"
| 2021-01-17 || Win ||align=left| Cyril Cereyon || Ultimate Fight Night || Brest, France ||  Decision (Unanimous) || 3 || 3:00 
|-
|-  style="background:#cfc;"
| 2020-12-18 || Win ||align=left| Strahinja Mitrić || Megdan 8: New Winners || Sremska Mitrovica, Serbia || Decision (Split) || 3 || 3:00
|- 
! style=background:white colspan=9 |
|-
|- style="background:#fbb;"
| 2019-12-15 || Loss ||align=left| Petr Romankevich  || Tatneft Cup, Tournament Final || Kazan, Russia || Ext. R. Decision (Unanimous) || 3 || 3:00
|- 
! style=background:white colspan=9 |
|- 
|- style="background:#cfc;"
| 2019-10-04 || Win ||align=left| Mathieu Kongolo  || Tatneft Cup, Tournament Semifinal || Kazan, Russia || TKO (Retirement) || 2 ||  1:28
|- 
|- style="background:#cfc;"
| 2019-07-19 || Win ||align=left| Igor Darmeshkin  || Tatneft Cup, Tournament Quarterfinal || Kazan, Russia || Ext. R. Decision (Unanimous) || 4 || 3:00
|- 
|- style="background:#fbb;"
| 2019-06-15 || Loss ||align=left| Guto Inocente  || WGP Kickboxing #55 || Brasilia, Brazil || Decision (Unanimous) || 5 ||  3:00 
|- 
! style=background:white colspan=9 |
|- 
|- style="background:#cfc;"
| 2019-04-26 || Win ||align=left| Liu Wei || Tatneft Cup, Tournament Round of 16 || Kazan, Russia || KO (Head kick) || 1 || 0:05
|- 
|-  style="background:#cfc;"
| 2019-03-16 || Loss ||align=left| Pascal Toure || Power Trophy || Orange, France || TKO || 2 ||   
|- 
|-  style="background:#cfc;"
| 2018-11-17 || Win ||align=left| Mladen Kujundžić || Ultimate Fight Night || Koper, Slovenia || Decision (Unanimous) || 3 || 3:00
|-
|-  style="background:#cfc;"
| 2018-09-22 || Win ||align=left| Jan Beljajev || Number One Fight Show: Season 10 || Tallinn, Estonia || Decision (Unanimous) || 3 || 3:00
|-
|-  style="background:#cfc;"
| 2018-05-11 || Win ||align=left| Karim Zeghad || Ultimate Fight Night || Le Beausset, France || Decision (Unanimous) || 3 || 3:00
|-
|-  style="background:#cfc;"
| 2018-03-17 || Win ||align=left| Hassen Otman || Power Trophy 2018 || Orange, France || Decision (Unanimous) || 3 || 3:00
|-
|- style="background:#fbb;"
| 2017-11-11 || Loss ||align=left| David Vinš  || Night of Warriors 12 || Liberec, Czech Republic || KO (Left straight) || 3 ||  1:43
|- 
|-  style="background:#cfc;"
| 2017-01-14 || Win ||align=left| Alessandro Lamonica || The Night of Kick and Punch 6 || Milan, Italy || Decision (Unanimous) || 3 || 3:00
|-
|-  style="background:#cfc;"
| 2016-04-16 || Win ||align=left| Danilo Coda || Sacile in Fight || Italy || TKO (Retirement) ||  || 
|-
|- style="background:#fbb;"
| 2015-03-28 || Loss ||align=left| Pavel Voronin  || Kombat League, Tournament Semifinal || Verona, Italy || KO (Left hook) || 1 || 
|- 
|-  style="background:#cfc;"
| 2014-06-17 || Win ||align=left| Nico Zerbin ||  || Spinea, Italy || TKO  || 2 || 
|-
| colspan=9 | Legend:

See also
 List of male kickboxers
List of Italians of Albanian descent

References

Living people
1993 births
Italian male kickboxers
21st-century Italian people
Italian people of Albanian descent
People from Sacile